The U.S. Army Audit Agency (USAAA) provides objective and independent auditing services to the United States Army.

At the request of the Under Secretary of War, the Army Audit Agency was established on 12 November 1946 with the issuance of General Order No. 135. The Agency was placed under the jurisdiction of the Chief of Finance and tasked with maintaining appropriation and fund accounting, maintaining military property accountability, and auditing the accounts of the American Red Cross.

With implementation of the DOD Reorganization Act of 1986, the Agency was placed under the sole jurisdiction of The Secretary of the Army. Subsequent General Orders made The Auditor General responsible for internal audit services throughout the Department of the Army, including audit policy, training, follow-up, and liaison with external audit organizations.

The Auditor General of the Army, The Principal Deputy Auditor General, and four Deputy Auditor Generals, each of whom is in charge of specific aspects of agency operations – Acquisitions, Cyber, and Logistics Audits, Forces and Infrastructure Audits, Operations Management Audits, and Business Operations Audits, lead the U.S. Army Audit Agency.

The Agency Headquarters is located in Alexandria, Virginia and has 17 field offices—14 in the continental United States and 3 outside the continental United States (Germany, Hawaii, and the Republic of Korea). In 1994, the agency was selected to be a Government Performance and Results Act pilot agency.

The Agency is authorized 608 personnel (607 civilians and 1 military). For the most part, the audit teams are functionally aligned, but two teams have a geographic focus: Theater Operations, Europe and Theater Operations, Pacific. There is another team that works directly with deployed Army units in Kuwait, Iraq, and Afghanistan.

References

External links
 
 FY2011-FY2015 Strategic Plan

Auditing in the United States
United States Army organization